The Committee of the Soviet Youth Organizations or USSR Youth Organization Committee was a public organization in the Soviet Union primarily in the field of international youth relations. It was established in 1956 on the basis of the Anti-Fascist Committee of the Soviet Youth (1941-1956). It united various civic, professional, sports, student, cultural, etc. organizations of the Soviet youth.

Committee chairmen
 Yevgeny Konstantinovich Fyodorov (1941-?)
 Kochemasov, Vyacheslav Ivanovich (1949-1954) - Chairman of the Anti-Fascist Committee of Soviet Youth
 Romanovsky, Sergey Kalistratovich (May 1954 - February 1960) - Chairman of the Anti-Fascist Committee of Soviet Youth until 1956
 Reshetov Petr Nikolaevich (February 1960 - 1966)
 Yarovoy, Vladimir Grigorievich (May 1966 - February 1968)
 Yanayev, Gennady Ivanovich (March 1968 - January 1980) 
 Aksyonov, Vladimir Alexandrovich (January 1980 - April 1987) 
 Chelnokov, Sergey Nikolaevich (April 1987 - May 1989)
 Kovylov, Alexey Ivanovich (1989–1991)
 Koshmarov (Trubetskoy), Alexey Yuryevich (1991–2016) - Chairman of the International Committee of Youth Organizations (ICMO) - assignee of the USSR KMO)

References

Komsomol
Political organizations based in the Soviet Union
1956 establishments in the Soviet Union